Smart Axiata Company Limited, doing business as Smart (formerly known as Smart Mobile) was acquired by Hello Axiata, is Cambodia's telecommunications service provider.

In 2015, Smart launched the Smart Music service, signing many original musicians exclusivity to their streaming platform. Smart is now one of the largest supporters of the new Original Music Movement in Cambodia.

References

Axiata
Vodafone